The following outline is provided as an overview of and topical guide to Eswatini:

Eswatini (officially the Kingdom of Eswatini) – is a small, landlocked, sovereign country located in Southern Africa, bordered by South Africa on three sides except to the east, where it borders Mozambique.  The country, inhabited primarily by Bantu-speaking Swazi people, is named after the 19th-century king Mswati II, from whom the people also take their name.

General reference 

 Pronunciation: 
 Common English country name:  Eswatini
 Official English country name:  The Kingdom of Eswatini
 Common endonym(s):   eSwatini
 Official endonym(s): The Kingdom of Eswatini
Adjectival(s): Swazi
Demonym(s): Swazi
 ISO country codes: SZ, SWZ, 748
 ISO region codes: See ISO 3166-2:SZ
 Country code top-level domain:  .sz

Geography of Eswatini

Geography of Eswatini
 Eswatini is: a landlocked country
 Location:
 Eastern Hemisphere and Southern Hemisphere
 Africa
 Southern Africa
 Time zone:  South African Standard Time (UTC+02)
 Extreme points of Eswatini
 High:  Emlembe 
 Low:  Maputo River 
 Land boundaries:  535 km
 430 km
 105 km
 Coastline:  none
 Population:: 1,467,152  - 154th most populous country

 Area: 17,364 km2
 Atlas of Eswatini

Environment of Eswatini 

 Climate of Eswatini
 Ecoregions in Eswatini
 Protected areas of Eswatini
 National parks of Eswatini
 Wildlife of Eswatini
 Fauna of Eswatini
 Birds of Eswatini
 Mammals of Eswatini

Natural geographic features of Eswatini 

 Glaciers in Eswatini: none 
 Rivers of Eswatini
 World Heritage Sites in Eswatini: None

Regions of Eswatini 

Regions of Eswatini
Hhohho
Lubombo
Manzini
Shiselweni

Ecoregions of Eswatini 

List of ecoregions in Eswatini
 Ecoregions in Eswatini

Administrative divisions of Eswatini 

Administrative divisions of Eswatini
 Regions of Eswatini

Demography of Eswatini 

Demographics of Eswatini

Government and politics of Eswatini
Politics of Eswatini
 Form of government: Absolute diarchy
 Capital of Eswatini: Lobamba (royal and legislative), Mbabane (administrative)
 Elections in Eswatini
 List of political parties in Eswatini

Branches of the government of Eswatini 

Government of Eswatini

Executive branch of the government of Eswatini 
 Head of state: King of Eswatini,
 Head of government: Prime Minister of Eswatini,

Legislative branch of the government of Eswatini 

 Parliament of Eswatini (bicameral)
Upper house: Senate of Eswatini
 Lower house: House of Commons of Eswatini

Judicial branch of the government of Eswatini 

Court system of Eswatini

Foreign relations of Eswatini 

Foreign relations of Eswatini
 List of diplomatic missions in Eswatini
 Diplomatic missions of Eswatini

International organization membership 
The Kingdom of Eswatini is a member of:

African, Caribbean, and Pacific Group of States (ACP)
African Development Bank Group (AfDB)
African Union (AU)
Common Market for Eastern and Southern Africa (COMESA)
Commonwealth of Nations
Food and Agriculture Organization (FAO)
Group of 77 (G77)
International Bank for Reconstruction and Development (IBRD)
International Civil Aviation Organization (ICAO)
International Criminal Police Organization (Interpol)
International Development Association (IDA)
International Federation of Red Cross and Red Crescent Societies (IFRCS)
International Finance Corporation (IFC)
International Fund for Agricultural Development (IFAD)
International Labour Organization (ILO)
International Monetary Fund (IMF)
International Olympic Committee (IOC)
International Organization for Standardization (ISO) (correspondent)
International Red Cross and Red Crescent Movement (ICRM)
International Telecommunication Union (ITU)

International Telecommunications Satellite Organization (ITSO)
International Trade Union Confederation (ITUC)
Multilateral Investment Guarantee Agency (MIGA)
Nonaligned Movement (NAM)
Organisation for the Prohibition of Chemical Weapons (OPCW)
Permanent Court of Arbitration (PCA)
Southern African Customs Union (SACU)
Southern African Development Community (SADC)
United Nations (UN)
United Nations Conference on Trade and Development (UNCTAD)
United Nations Educational, Scientific, and Cultural Organization (UNESCO)
United Nations Industrial Development Organization (UNIDO)
Universal Postal Union (UPU)
World Customs Organization (WCO)
World Federation of Trade Unions (WFTU)
World Health Organization (WHO)
World Intellectual Property Organization (WIPO)
World Meteorological Organization (WMO)
World Tourism Organization (UNWTO)
World Trade Organization (WTO)

Law and order in Eswatini 

Law of Eswatini
 Constitution of Eswatini
 Human rights in Eswatini
LGBT rights in Eswatini
 Law enforcement in Eswatini

Military of Eswatini 

Military of Eswatini
 Command
 Commander-in-chief:
 Forces
Umbutfo Eswatini Defence Force
 Air Force of Eswatini

Local government in Eswatini 

Local government in Eswatini

History of Eswatini 

History of Eswatini
 Current events of Eswatini

Culture of Eswatini 

Culture of Eswatini
 Cuisine of Eswatini
 Languages of Eswatini
 National symbols of Eswatini
Coat of arms of Eswatini
 Flag of Eswatini
 National anthem of Eswatini
 People of Eswatini
 Prostitution in Eswatini
 Public holidays in Eswatini
 Religion in Eswatini
Hinduism in Eswatini
 Islam in Eswatini
 Sikhism in Eswatini
 World Heritage Sites in Eswatini: None

Art in Eswatini 
 Music of Eswatini

Media in Eswatini
 Swazi Media Commentary

Sports in Eswatini 

Sports in Eswatini
 Football in Eswatini
 Eswatini at the Olympics

Economy and infrastructure of Eswatini 

Economy of Eswatini
 Economic rank, by nominal GDP (2007): 150th (one hundred and fiftieth)
 Telecommunications in Eswatini
Internet in Eswatini
 List of companies of Eswatini
 Currency of Eswatini: Swazi lilangeni (SZL)
 Health in Eswatini
 Mining in Eswatini
 Eswatini Stock Market
 Tourism in Eswatini
 Transport in Eswatini
List of airports in Eswatini
 Rail transport in Eswatini

Education in Eswatini 

Education in Eswatini

See also 

 Eswatini
List of international rankings
Member state of the Commonwealth of Nations
Member state of the United Nations
Outline of Africa

References

External links 

 The Government Of the Kingdom Of Eswatini (official website)
 Swaziland Travel Guide (Archived 2012)
 Official Eswatini tourism website
 
 
 Eswatini. The World Factbook. Central Intelligence Agency.
 US State Department - Eswatini includes Background Notes, Country Study and major reports

Eswatini
Eswatini
 1
 Outline